Four track may refer to:

4-track tape
Quadruple track railroad
Stereo-Pak